Ahmadabad (also Romanized as Aḩmadābād) is a village in Dizaj Rural District, in the Central District of Khoy County, West Azerbaijan Province, Iran. At the 2006 census, its population was 1,159, in 209 families.

References 

Populated places in Khoy County